Okrouhlá is a municipality and village in Cheb District in the Karlovy Vary Region of the Czech Republic. It has about 200 inhabitants.

Administrative parts
The village of Jesenice is an administrative part of Okrouhlá.

History
The first written mention of Okrouhlá is from 1299.

Gallery

References

Villages in Cheb District